The county of Brunengeruz (or Brugeron, Brunengeruuz, Brunengurt) existed in the 10th and 11th centuries in what is now eastern Belgium, between the towns of Leuven, on the river Dyle and Tienen, on the river Gete, within the larger region known as the Hesbaye. The name is sometimes interpreted with "corrected" forms such as Brunenrode, because the Latin spellings are believed to derive from Brūninga roþa, a forest clearing (typically rode or rooi in modern Dutch placenames) belonging to the kinsfolk of Bruno.

August 27th 988, this county was granted by Otto III to be part of the secular lordship of the bishops of Liège, contributing to the creation of the "prince-bishopric" of Liège. There are indications that prior to this the county had been held by a countess named Alpeidis, who may have also originally have held Jodoigne in the 10th century as part of this county. 

In 1036 the place Wulmerson, near Grimde, was mentioned in a record as being in the county of "Brunengurt".

The county came to be claimed by the counts of Leuven and over several generations they achieved control of most of the area, excluding Hoegaarden, Beauvechain, Tourinnes-la-Grosse and Chaumont. By 1155, if not earlier, Hoegaarden came to be seen as the chief town of the leftover "county", which remained under the bishops.

The 13th-century writer Giles of Orval in his Gesta episcoporum Leodiensium (II.44) in the entry for 1099, defined the boundaries of the 11th-century version of the disputed county. He explained that the this county, contested by the prince-bishops of Liège and the counts of Leuven, was granted by the prince-bishop to Albert III, Count of Namur. Albert's family did not maintain control though, and most of the county came increasingly under the control of Leuven.

Giles described a relatively large area covering much of eastern Flemish Brabant and Walloon Brabant, stretching from Louvain to Tienen.  Among the places named was Brunengeruz itself, which was in or near modern  (medieval Rode).

References

Bibliography

 

Counts
History of Walloon Brabant
History of Flemish Brabant
Counties of the Holy Roman Empire
Medieval Belgium